Qarah Zia od Din (also Romanized as Qarah Ẕīā' od Dīn,  Qareh Zeyā ed Dīn, Qareh Ẕīā' od Dīn, and Qareh Zīyā ’Eddīn; also known as Ghareh Ziya’ Oddin, Qaraziadin and Qara Zīa ud Dīn) is a city in the Central District of Chaypareh County, West Azerbaijan province, Iran, and serves as capital of the county.

At the 2006 census, its population (as the capital city of the former Chaypareh District in Khoy County) was 22,589 in 5,558 households. The following census in 2011 counted 23,769 people in 6,482 households, by which time the district was separated from the county, established as Chaypareh County, and divided into two districts. The latest census in 2016 showed a population of 26,767 people in 7,819 households.

References 

Chaypareh County

Cities in West Azerbaijan Province

Populated places in West Azerbaijan Province

Populated places in Chaypareh County